Propaganda in the United Kingdom can refer to:
British propaganda during World War I
British propaganda during World War II
Nazi propaganda and the United Kingdom